Hamatophyton is a genus of the extinct Sphenophyllales horsetails. Unique to this genus among other Sphenophyllales is its lack of secondary xylem around the tips of the primary xylem arms.

References

Horsetails
Late Devonian plants
Mississippian plants
Prehistoric plant genera
Late Devonian first appearances
Mississippian extinctions
Famennian life
Tournaisian life
Famennian genus first appearances